Jon Stock (born 12 May 1966 in England) is a British author and journalist.

Early life and family
Stock was educated at Sherborne School in Dorset and at Magdalene College, Cambridge, England. He lives in Wiltshire with his wife Hilary Stock the fine art photographer, and they have three children. He is currently the Royal Literary Fund Writing Fellow at Mansfield College, University of Oxford. He has three brothers, one of whom is Andrew Stock, former president of the Society of Wildlife Artists.

Journalism
Stock is a full-time author and journalist. He was the editor of the Weekend section of The Daily Telegraph in the UK from 2005 till 2010. He left the paper in January 2010 to complete a trilogy of spy thrillers and returned in March 2013 to edit the paper's online books channel, before rejoining the staff as Weekend editor in June 2014. He left the paper in October 2015 to pursue his writing career.

Additionally he was a columnist for The Week magazine in India, contributing to their column "The Last Word" from 1996 until 2012. He previously worked in Delhi, India, for a period of two years, as a foreign correspondent for The Daily Telegraph, and has also lived in Cochin, Kerala.

Bibliography
Stock has written six spy novels under his own name, and, most recently, five psychological thrillers under the pen name J.S.Monroe. The Riot Act (1997) was published by Serpent's Tail, The Cardamom Club (2003) was published by Blackamber (now part of Arcadia Books), and in India (2004) by Penguin Books. 

The Riot Act was short-listed by the Crime Writers' Association for its best first novel award. It has been published in France by Éditions Gallimard as Lutte Des Casses (2002) as part of its acclaimed Série Noire imprint.

Dead Spy Running (2009, published by Blue Door) was the first in the Legoland trilogy. The fourth book, Games Traitors Play (published by Blue Door on 3 March 2011), was the second in the trilogy. His fifth book Dirty Little Secret (Blue Door, 1 July 2012) was the concluding book in the Legoland trilogy.

Legoland trilogy
Stock signed a three-book deal in July 2008 with Blue Door, a new HarperCollins imprint, for "a good six-figure sum", according to The Bookseller(15 July 2008). The spy novel series, all starring MI6 officer Daniel Marchant, commenced with Dead Spy Running, which was published on 7 January 2010. The second in the series was Games Traitors Play, published on 29 September 2011. The last in the series, Dirty Little Secret, was released on 5 July 2012.

While researching for Dirty Little Secret he came across the Seraj, an Iranian fast attack craft based on the high-performance British speedboat, the Bradstone Challenger. Stock wrote a detailed article in the Daily Telegraph, on how the Iranians plan to use it as a fast attack boat against the United States Navy in any future conflict in the Strait of Hormuz.

Find Me
Stock's sixth novel, Find Me, was published by Head of Zeus under the pen name J. S. Monroe in the UK in February 2017,  and by Harlequin MIRA in the US in March 2017. Find Me is a 'high concept' psychological thriller featuring Jar, a young Irish writer, who is convinced that his girlfriend, who committed suicide five years ago at university, might still be alive. Publishers Marketplace has mentioned Find Me as having "notes of Harlan Coben's Tell No One and Ian McEwan's Sweet Tooth". Find Me has been translated into 14 languages till now.

To Snare a Spy
To Snare a Spy is Stock's seventh novel, published 20 April 2017 by The Nare Hotel Co Ltd, Cornwall, UK. It is a spy thriller featuring protagonist Noah, a teenager who learns of a Russian mole in the British government.

Forget My Name
Stock's eighth novel, Forget My Name, was published by Head of Zeus under the pen name J. S. Monroe on 4 October 2018. This book is about a woman who loses her memory, and only remembers her home address, and has lost all her ids after her bag is stolen.

The Other You
Stock's ninth novel, The Other You, was published by Head of Zeus under the pen name J. S. Monroe on 9 January 2020. It's a psychological thriller about a super recogniser called Kate, who suspects that her partner has been replaced by his doppelgänger.

The Man on Hackpen Hill
Stock's tenth novel, The Man on Hackpen Hill, was published by Head of Zeus under the pen name J. S. Monroe on 3 September  2021 and is the third novel to feature DI Silas Hart, head of Swindon CID.  A suspense thriller, it begins with the discovery of a dead body in the middle of a mathematical crop circle in Wiltshire.

No Place to Hide
No Place to Hide is Stock's eleventh novel, to be published by Head of Zeus under the pen name J. S. Monroe on 13 April 2023. A psychological thriller, it is about a successful doctor in London whose life and marriage implode when his past as a medical student catches up with him.

The Sleep Room
Stock's next book is a non fiction book titled The Sleep Room. It is based on the psychiatric treatments conducted by British doctor William Sargant in the 60's and 70's. Stock researched this book by contacting the survivors of Sargant's experiments. He also accessed Sargant's papers at the Wellcome Collection and the recently released documents at National Archives in Kew. The rights to publish his book in the UK and Commonwealth has been bought by The Bridge Street Press, from the Little, Brown Book Group.

Movie deal
Warner Bros. acquired the movie rights to the Dead Spy Running franchise in October 2008 to make the first of a proposed three-movie franchise.  They signed on Charlie's Angels director McG to direct the movie along with Stephen Gaghan to write the screen play. It was initially reported that after the shooting of McG's last movie Terminator Salvation, he would be taking up the shooting of the remake Captain Nemo: 20,000 Leagues Under the Sea, but with the cancelling of this movie by Disney it had appeared that Dead Spy Running was the next movie to be taken up.

In March 2012, it was reported that Jonathan Levine was in talks with Warner Bros to direct Dead Spy Running, but in September 2012 Warner Brothers announced that they had hired Adam Wingard to direct, and Simon Barrett to rewrite the screenplay of Dead Spy Running. Wingard and Barrett have worked together on indie horror movies, including You're Next, V/H/S and A Horrible Way to Die. In 2014, McG has bought the movie rights with his own company, Wonderland Sound and Vision, and the film is currently in development.

References

External links
 J.S. Monroe

1966 births
Living people
People educated at Sherborne School
20th-century British novelists
21st-century British novelists
Alumni of Magdalene College, Cambridge
British columnists
British male journalists
British male novelists
20th-century British male writers
21st-century British male writers